Nazaria-i-Pakistan Trust  was established in July 1992 by former Chief Minister of Punjab Ghulam Haider Wyne (Late). Nazaria-i-Pakistan Trust is a non-parochial national academic cum research institution for promoting the Ideology of Pakistan as declared by Quaid-i-Azam Mohammad Ali Jinnah and Allama Mohammad Iqbal. To perform this role the trust aims at those objectives for which Pakistan was established, recalling sacrifices rendered to achieve it, and creating awareness among people, particularly youth, about its ideological basis and its Islamic cultural heritage. 

Majid Nizami is chairman of this trust along with Begum Majeeda Wyne as Senior Vice Chairperson and former president of Pakistan Muhammad Rafiq Tarar as Vice-Chairman.

Trust activities
The trust has multi-faceted objectives, such as preservation of the spirit and memory of the Pakistan Movement and propagation and projection of the Ideology of Pakistan; to work on national unity and to promote the ideology of Pakistan.

References

External links
Official Website
 Zahid Hamid visit Nazria-i-Pakistan trust's 

Political organisations based in Pakistan
Cultural organisations based in Pakistan